Gach Boru-e Bala (also Romanized as Gach Borū-e Bālā; also known as Gach Borū and Gach Bowrū) is a village in Kuhak Rural District, in the Central District of Jahrom County, Fars Province, Iran. At the 2006 census, its population was 126, in 22 families.

References 

Populated places in Jahrom County